This article lists all the colleges in, Nilgiris, Tamil Nadu, India.
 The Tamilnad State Rural Communities College -Gudalur
 Nilgiri College of Arts and Science, Thaloor, Erumad, The Nilgiris, Tamilnadu, India #1 India's First AI-Enabled Campus
 DP Labs DP School of Banking and TNPSC, Gudalur
 CSI College of Engineering, Ketti, Ooty
 Government Arts College, Stone House Hill, Ooty
Suverna International Institute of Management Studies, Bluemountain School Road, Ooty
 JSS College of Pharmacy, Rocklands, Ooty
 J.S.S. Institute of Naturopathy and Yogic Science, Rocklands, Ooty
 Bethlehem Teacher Training Institute, Ooty
 Merit Swiss Asian School of Hotel Management, Havelock Road
 Emerald Heights College for Women, Finger Post, Ooty
 Monarch International College of Hotel Management, Forest Gate, Pudumund, Ooty
 Government Polytechnic, Finger Post, Ooty
 St. Josephs Industrial School, Finger Post, Ooty
 Tribal research Centre Tamil University, M.Palada, Ooty
 Sacred Heart Technical Institute, Charing Cross, Ooty
 St. Joseph's College of Education, St. Mary's Hill, Ooty.
 Oxford Teacher Training Institute, Blackwood Cottage, Ooty
 Providence College for Women, Bandishola Spring Field, Coonoor
 Riga College of Hotel Management, Coonoor
 Govt. Industrial Training Institute, Coonoor
 M R S Technical Institute, Coonoor
 Rural Development Institute Gudalur
 Bharathiar University Arts and Science College, Gudalur
 Plantation Workers Industrial (ITI), Mica Mount, Gudalur
 McGan Ooty School of Architecture, Gudalur
 Kapeeyes College of Arts and Science, Kotagiri
 District Institute of Education and Training, Kotagiri
 NPA Centenary Polytechnic College, Kotagiri
 House of joy Vocational Training Centre for the Blind, Kotagiri
 Annai Madhammal Institute of Hotel Management College, Ooty

References 

Education in Nilgiris district
Ooty